Malaysia first participated at the Olympic Games in 1956, and has sent athletes to compete in every Summer Olympic Games since then, except when Malaysia participated in the American-led boycott of the 1980 Summer Olympics. Malaysia made their debut at the Winter Olympic Games in 2018.

The Federation of Malaya (now the states comprising West Malaysia) competed as Malaya (MAL) in the 1956 and 1960 Games. The present day state of Sabah sent an independent team to the 1956 Games as North Borneo, and Singapore also competed at the Olympics from 1948 to 1960. After these British colonies federated to form an independent Malaysia in 1963, the nation competed under that name for the first time at the 1964 Summer Olympics. Malaysia would inherit Malaya's code MAL until 1988 when it started competing under its present code MAS. Singapore would subsequently regain independence from Malaysia in 1965 and compete once again as Singapore from 1968 onwards.

Malaysian athletes have won a total of 13 Olympic medals, 9 in badminton, 2 in diving and 2 in cycling. The first Malaysian Olympians to win Olympic medals were two of the Sidek brothers, Razif Sidek and Jalani Sidek back in the 1992 Summer Olympics. The Malaysian athlete with the most number of medals won is Lee Chong Wei with 3 silver medals in badminton. No Malaysian athlete has ever won a gold medal, making Malaysia the country that has won the most Olympic medals without striking gold.

The National Olympic Committee for Malaya was created in 1953 and recognised by the International Olympic Committee in 1954. This subsequently became the National Olympic Committee for Malaysia.

Medals

Medals by Summer Games

Medals by Winter Games

Medals by Summer Sport

Medals by Winter Sport

Medals of demonstration and exhibition sports 
*Only for demonstration and exhibition sports medalists

List of medalists
 Medalist of Demonstration & Exhibition Sports

Medals by individual
According to official data of the International Olympic Committee. This is a list of people who have won two or more Olympic medals for Malaysia. 

People in bold are still active competitors

See also
 Malaysia at the Paralympics
 Malaysia at the Youth Olympics
 List of flag bearers for Malaysia at the Olympics

References

External links